The Canton of Valmont is a former canton situated in the Seine-Maritime département and in the Haute-Normandie region of northern France. It was disbanded following the French canton reorganisation which came into effect in March 2015. It consisted of 22 communes, which joined the canton of Fécamp in 2015. It had a total of 11,309 inhabitants (2012).

Geography 
An area of forestry, farming and associated light industry in the arrondissement of Le Havre, centred on the village of Valmont. The altitude varies from 0m (Életot) to 134m (Riville) with an average altitude of 108m.

The canton comprised 22 communes:

Ancretteville-sur-Mer
Angerville-la-Martel
Colleville
Contremoulins
Criquetot-le-Mauconduit
Écretteville-sur-Mer
Életot
Gerponville
Limpiville
Riville
Sainte-Hélène-Bondeville
Saint-Pierre-en-Port
Sassetot-le-Mauconduit
Sorquainville
Thérouldeville
Theuville-aux-Maillots
Thiergeville
Thiétreville
Toussaint
Valmont
Vinnemerville
Ypreville-Biville

Population

See also 
 Arrondissements of the Seine-Maritime department
 Cantons of the Seine-Maritime department
 Communes of the Seine-Maritime department

References

Valmont
2015 disestablishments in France
States and territories disestablished in 2015